"Worse Comes to Worst" is a song by singer Billy Joel released as the second single from his 1973 album Piano Man. It reached #80 on the Billboard Hot 100.

Reception
Cash Box said that "this rocking, funky tune that will open up an entirely new audience" for Joel, stating that is contains "some great guitar licks throughout backing Billy's vocals and some fine harmonies."  Record World said that Joel "gets funkier with another personal tale of love, stardom and glory set in today's uncertain circumstances" and that "tinges of organ and steel drums blend into a trendsetting Latin-rock variant." Billboard recommended the song.

Music lecturer Ken Bielen describes "Worse Comes to Worst" as being "a little bit country, a little bit rock and a little bit gospel."

Chart positions

References

Billy Joel songs
1974 singles
Songs written by Billy Joel
Columbia Records singles
Song recordings produced by Michael Stewart (musician)
1973 songs